Cranwich Camp is a  biological Site of Special Scientific Interest north-west of Thetford in Norfolk. It is part of the Breckland Special Area of Conservation and Special Protection Area.

This former army camp in the Breckland is now grassland, and it has a high value both entomologically and botanically. It has four Red Data Book insects and three Red Data Book plants. Rabbits help to maintain the diverse flora and disturbed ground.

The site is open to the public.

References

Sites of Special Scientific Interest in Norfolk
Special Protection Areas in England
Special Areas of Conservation in England